Jack Thompson may refer to:

Sports
Jack Thompson (footballer, born 1892) (1892–1969), English footballer who played for Sheffield United and Bristol City
Jack Thompson (1920s footballer), English footballer who played for Aston Villa and Brighton & Hove Albion
Jack Thompson (boxer) (1904–1946), American boxer
Jack Thompson (Australian footballer) (1927–1961), Australian footballer for Collingwood
Jack Thompson (basketball) (born 1946), American professional basketball player
Jack Thompson (American football) (born 1956), American Samoan football quarterback
Jack Thompson (American soccer) (born 1992), American soccer player

Other
Jack Thompson (politician) (1928–2011), British politician
Jack Thompson (actor) (born 1940), Australian film and television star
T. Jack Thompson (1943–2017), Irish missiologist and scholar of African Christianity
Jack Thompson (activist) (born 1951), disbarred Florida attorney known for his actions against violent video games
Jack Thompson, a fictional character from Marvel's Agent Carter

See also
Jack Thomson (disambiguation)
John Thompson (disambiguation)